Sideroxylon durifolium is a species of plant in the family Sapotaceae. It is endemic to Belize.

References

Flora of Belize
durifolium
Vulnerable plants
Endemic flora of Belize
Taxonomy articles created by Polbot